Kolpina (Seto/Võro: Kulḱna) is the largest island in Lake Pskov (the southern part of Lake Peipus-Pskov). It is part of Pechorsky District, Pskov Oblast, Russia. 1920–1944 it belonged to Estonia and was part of Kulje Parish, Petseri County. After the annexation of Estonia by the Soviet Union in 1940, it went to the Russian SFSR in 1944 and then to Russia.

In April 1934, the island was the site of a mass brawl of 150 participants, resulting in 50 injured locals.

References

Islands of Russia
Landforms of Pskov Oblast
Lake islands of Russia